The León–A Coruña railway is an Iberian-gauge railway in Spain, providing the main route from Madrid to Galicia. The Adif designation for the line is Line 800.

Route
The line runs through the provinces of León, Ourense, Lugo and A Coruña. Important towns served include Monforte de Lemos, Lugo and Ponferrada.

Services
There is no through service operating on the line in its entirety; with A Coruña to León direct trains being routed via Santiago de Compostela. However, Media Distancia services run from A Coruña to Monforte de Lemos, where Alvia trains use the second stretch of the line to León. Regional Express services call at smaller stations on various stretches of the line.

References

Railway lines opened in 1883
Iberian gauge railways